Willy Rey (born Wilhelmina Rietveld, 25 August 1949 – 19 August 1973) was a Dutch-Canadian model. She was Playboy magazine's Playmate of the Month for its February 1971 issue.  Her centerfold was photographed by Mario Casilli.

When she was six years old, her family moved from the Netherlands to Canada.

Willy Rey's nude likeness adorned the stock certificate of Playboy Enterprises at the time of its initial public offering on 3 November 1971.

She died of an overdose of barbiturates (sleeping pills) in Vancouver on 19 August 1973.

See also 
 List of people in Playboy 1970–1979

References

External links 
 

1949 births
1973 suicides
Dutch emigrants to Canada
1970s Playboy Playmates
Suicides in British Columbia
Drug-related suicides in Canada
Barbiturates-related deaths